Newt Graham Lock & Dam (also known as Newt Graham Lock and Dam 18, Newt Graham Lake, Newt Graham Reservoir and Newt Graham Pool.)  is the final lock and dam of the McClellan-Kerr Arkansas River Navigation System (MKARNS) before reaching the western terminus, Tulsa Port of Catoosa on the Verdigris River.

Nearby cities and towns

Broken Arrow, Oklahoma is  due west.

Construction started in 1967 and was completed in 1970. Estimated cost of the project was $43.4 million.

Recreation

Fishing and Hunting
The waters around Newt Graham Lock & Dam have a plentiful supply of fish. People who wish to fish must have current Oklahoma fishing licenses. The most common species are: largemouth bass, striped bass, crappie, channel catfish, flatheads and sunfish.

The U.S. Army Corps of Engineers manages two boat landings on the Lock 18 Pool: Bluff Landing and Highway 33 Landing. Camping is allowed only at Bluff Landing, where camping and day use fees are collected. Camping is prohibited at Highway 33 Landing, which is limited to boat launching and day use. Boat launching is free at this landing. There are 25 campsites with electrical hookups and 7 without. Campsites are open year-round.

Hunting in the area around the Lock 18 Pool is governed by the same Federal and state laws and regulations as elsewhere in Oklahoma. License requirements are also the same. Popular species for hunters here are: whitetail deer, dove, quail, squirrel, rabbit, turkey and several species of migratory waterfowl.

References

Dams completed in 1970
Geography of Tulsa County, Oklahoma
Reservoirs in Oklahoma